Aleksei Nikolayevich Turik (born 25 April 1995) is a Russian football player.

Club career
Turik made his professional debut in the Russian Professional Football League for FC Fakel Voronezh on 28 August 2014 in a game against FC Tambov. He made his Russian Football National League debut for Fakel on 20 July 2015 in a game against FC Gazovik Orenburg.
On 9 December 2019, Turik was released by FC Noah.

References

External links
 
 
 

1995 births
Footballers from Moscow
Living people
Russian footballers
Association football forwards
Russia youth international footballers
Russian expatriate footballers
Expatriate footballers in Armenia
Expatriate footballers in Belarus
Russian expatriate sportspeople in Armenia
Armenian Premier League players
FC Lokomotiv Moscow players
FC Fakel Voronezh players
FC Armavir players
FC KAMAZ Naberezhnye Chelny players
FC Zenit-Izhevsk players
FC Noah players
FC Smolevichi players